Trigonoorda psarochroa is a moth in the family Crambidae. It was described by Turner in 1908. It is found in Australia, where it has been recorded from Queensland.

The wingspan is about 27 mm. The forewings are whitish, irrorated with grey and with fuscous markings. The hindwings are whitish with grey suffusion towards the termen. Adults have been recorded on wing in March.

References

Moths described in 1908
Odontiinae